Wayne Eastman (born 16 January 1942) is  a former Australian rules footballer who played with Fitzroy in the Victorian Football League (VFL).

Football
On 6 July 1963, playing on the wing, he was a member of the young and inexperienced Fitzroy team that comprehensively and unexpectedly defeated Geelong, 9.13 (67) to 3.13 (31) in the 1963 Miracle Match.

See also
 1963 Miracle Match

Notes

References

External links 		
		
				
		
		
Living people		
1942 births				
Australian rules footballers from Victoria (Australia)		
Fitzroy Football Club players